The list is based on CIA World Factbook estimates for the year 2017. Only fully recognised sovereign states with United Nations membership are included on this list.

List

References 

Population growth
Population Growth Rate, Africa